Hindon may refer to:

Hindon, Wiltshire, a village in England
 Hindon (UK Parliament constituency), a former parliamentary borough
Hindon, New Zealand, a small settlement on New Zealand's South Island
The Hindon River, India
Hindon Air Force Station, an Indian Air Force base on the river, near Delhi
Hindon Airport, civilian enclave within the station
Hindon metro station, a station on the Delhi Metro, near the river

See also 

 Hindaun (disambiguation)